Shepard S. Woodcock (1824-1910) was an American architect practicing in Boston, Massachusetts during the second half of the nineteenth century.

Early life and training
Shepard S. Woodcock was born on October 6, 1824, in Sidney, Maine to Franklin and Clymena Woodcock, née Sawtell. At the age of seventeen he went to Stow, Massachusetts to serve as an apprentice to a carpenter. After his apprenticeship ended, he moved to Boston, where he carried on the carpentry trade for more than ten years. During this period he studied architecture on his own time.

Professional career
In 1854, Woodcock retired from the carpenter's trade and opened an architect's office in Boston. In 1857 he was joined by George F. Meacham, and they had formed a partnership by 1858. The firm of Woodcock & Meacham was dissolved in 1864, when Meacham opened his own office. Woodcock practiced independently for the remainder of his career. By 1888 his reputation was such that he was called as an expert witness in an inquiry into the construction of the High Service Pumping Station at Chestnut Hill. At this time he estimated that he had designed at least 140 churches. Indeed, the bulk of his identifiable projects are churches for Protestant denominations, though he was also responsible for town halls, libraries, schools, office and mercantile buildings, banks, private residences and monuments.

Woodcock was admitted to the Massachusetts Charitable Mechanic Association in 1857, and was an active member of the organization until his death. He was elected to fellowship in the Boston Society of Architects in 1867, which became affiliated with the American Institute of Architects in 1870. He resigned from the organization in 1877.

Personal life
Woodcock was first married to Adeline Ryder, who died in 1850 at the age of 21. In the following year he married Julia Ann Swett, born in 1828 in Wales, Maine. They had at least seven children together, and she died in 1885. At his death he was survived by three daughters.

During the early phase of his career, Woodcock was a resident of Chelsea, Massachusetts. In the early 1860s he relocated to Somerville, where he remained until his death.

In addition to his professional affiliations, Woodcock was also a member of several Masonic and social organizations.

Legacy
In addition to Meacham, other notable architects who worked in Woodcock's office include Alfred Stone (1855), John C. Cochrane (1862-1863) and Alberto F. Haynes (1871-1877 and 1883–1884).

At least eight of his works are individually listed on the United States National Register of Historic Places, and others contribute to listed historic districts.

Architectural works

See also
O.P. Woodcock

References

Architects from Maine
Architects from Boston
1824 births
1910 deaths